The Central Committee for Defending Albanian Rights was formed in the city of Istanbul, Turkey, then Ottoman Empire on December 18, 1877, by an influential group of Albanian intellectuals, patriots, and politicians, such as Hasan Tahsini, Abdyl Frashëri, Iljaz Pasha Dibra, Ymer Prizreni, Sami Frashëri, Zija Prishtina, Ahmet Koronica, Mehmet Ali Vrioni, Said Toptani, Pashko Vasa, Jani Vreto, Pandeli Sotiri, Koto Hoxhi, and Mane Tahiri. The chairman of the committee was elected Abdyl Frashëri. The committee would be referred later with a more practical name as Komiteti i Stambollit ("Istambul Committee"). 

The goal of the committee was to disseminate the idea of an autonomous Albanian region within the steadily diminishing Ottoman Empire. The committee's plan and ideals were printed in the Tercuman i Sark paper, and anticipated the founding of a single Albanian vilayet that would encompass the vilayets of Kosovo, Monastir, Janina and Scutari. Contrary to what is often said, a claim for territories very often included the Salonica Vilayet too. As support for both the committee and the idea of a united autonomous Albania grew, supporters decided to meet in the city of Prizren. This became the first meeting of what came to be known as the League of Prizren.

In October 1879, elite members of the committee formed the Society for the Publication of Albanian Letters, which would perform the difficult tasks of establishing a unified alphabet and primer, and spreading the Albanian writings.

See also 
 Albanian Committee of Janina
 League of Prizren
 Convention of Dibra

References

Organizations of the Albanian National Awakening
1877 establishments in the Ottoman Empire
Albanian Question